Tillandsia marabascoensis is a species of flowering plant in the family Bromeliaceae, native to southwestern Mexico. It was first described in 1992.

References

marabascoensis
Flora of Southwestern Mexico